Azoia or Azóia may refer to:
 , a freguesia in the municipality of Leiria, Portugal
 Azóia, Sesimbra, a town in the municipality of Sesimbra, Portugal
 Azóia, Sintra, a village in the municipality of Sintra, Portugal
 , a town in the municipality of Loures, Portugal